Iver Tildheim Andersen (born 29 September 2000) is a Norwegian cross-country skier. He obtained his first World Cup win in December 2022, winning the 10 kilometer freestyle in Lillehammer, Norway. He also placed third in the 15 kilometer freestyle at the 2021 Nordic Under-23 World Ski Championships.

Cross-country skiing results
All results are sourced from the International Ski Federation (FIS).

World Cup

Season standings

Individual podiums
 1 victory – (1 )
 1 podium – (1 )

References

External links

2000 births
Living people
Norwegian male cross-country skiers